Ellen Greene is an American actress and singer. She has had a long and varied career as a singer, particularly in cabaret, as an actress and singer in numerous stage productions, particularly musical theatre, as well as having performed in many films and television series. Her best-known screen roles are as Audrey in the movie adaptation of Little Shop of Horrors, and as Vivian Charles in the ABC series Pushing Daisies.

Personal life
Greene was born in Brooklyn, New York. Her mother was a guidance counselor, and her father was a dentist. Greene is Jewish. She attended W. Tresper Clarke High School in Westbury, New York. She spent summers at Cejwin Camps in Port Jervis, New York, where she performed in musical theatre productions, including the role of Tzeitel in a 1966 production of Fiddler on the Roof. She had a relationship with puppeteer Martin P. Robinson. Her first marriage was to Tibor Hardik. She married Christian Klikovits on September 25, 2003; they have since divorced.

Career

Greene's career began as a nightclub singer in clubs such as The Brothers and Sisters, Continental Baths, Grand Finale, and Reno Sweeney's. She received rave reviews from critics such as Rex Reed, George Bell, and John S. Wilson. Around this time, she befriended the late Peter Allen. Her first starring role on Broadway was as the lead in the unsuccessful Broadway show Rachael Lily Rosenbloom (And Don't You Ever Forget It), which had 7 previews in 1973 but closed before officially opening. She then played the starring role of Chrissy in Joseph Papp's production of In the Boom Boom Room at the Off-Broadway Public Theatre in November to December 1974. Her reviews brought her to the attention of Paul Mazursky, who was at that time casting Next Stop, Greenwich Village (1976). She was cast in the role of Sarah, her first starring role in a film.

Continuing her work with Papp's New York Shakespeare Festival, Greene next played the role of Jenny in The Three Penny Opera (1976) at the Vivian Beaumont Theater in Lincoln Center, for which she was nominated for a 1977 Tony Award, Featured Actress In A Musical.

In addition to a number of other productions with the New York Shakespeare Festival and numerous other companies, Greene formed a close working relationship with the WPA Theatre, where she met Howard Ashman and Alan Menken. Their close, long-lasting friendship led to her landing the role of Audrey in Little Shop of Horrors, which she reprised in the film version opposite Rick Moranis.

Greene has worked extensively in theater, such as the part of Suzanne/The Little Rose in The Little Prince and the Aviator (1981).

She has worked in films such as I'm Dancing as Fast as I Can (1982), Léon, Talk Radio
(1987),<ref>[http://www.tcm.com/tcmdb/title/20303/Talk-Radio/ Talk Radio"] tcm.com, retrieved November 24, 2017</ref> and Pump Up the Volume (1990).

She has appeared on television in, among other programs, Miami Vice, The Adventures of Pete and Pete, Cybill, Law & Order, Suddenly Susan, The X-Files, and Heroes. In 1983 she was the voice of Creeping Ivy in the animated TV special The Magic of Herself the Elf.

Greene released an album in 2004 entitled In His Eyes, on which she was accompanied by her husband and musical director, Christian Klikovits. Other work includes the role of Vivian Charles on the television series Pushing Daisies (2007) and the voice of Dolly Gopher in the animated Out of Jimmy's Head. Greene was the voice of the Priscilla Presley type of character Goldie in the Don Bluth film Rock-a-Doodle (1991).

In July and August 2009, Greene starred as Miss Adelaide in a concert version of the musical Guys and Dolls, which had a 3-day engagement at the Hollywood Bowl in Los Angeles, California. Her co-stars included Scott Bakula as Nathan Detroit, Brian Stokes Mitchell as Sky Masterson, and Jessica Biel as Sarah Brown. In 2011, she appeared in five episodes on the soap opera The Young and the Restless as Primrose DeVille.

Greene performed in the musical Betwixt! at the Trafalgar Studios in London's West End from July 26 to August 20, 2011.

She appeared in two episodes of the new ABC Family show Bunheads (2012), alongside Sutton Foster and Kelly Bishop. She portrayed Doctor Gale Macones in The Walking Dead Webisodes: The Oath.

In 2015, Greene reprised her signature role as Audrey in Little Shop of Horrors in the staged concert at the New York City Center as part of their Encores! Off-Center Series. Aged 64 at the time, there was a wide 30-year age gap between her and the show's male lead, Jake Gyllenhaal, 34.

Greene performed in the 2016 Democratic National Convention's "Fight Song" video.

Filmography

 Film 

 Television 

Stage
Sources: Internet Off-Broadway Database; Playbill VaultRachael Lily Rosenbloom (And Don't You Ever Forget It) (1973) (never officially opened)In the Boom Boom Room (1974) (Off-Broadway)The Threepenny Opera (1976) (Broadway)The Threepenny Opera (1977) (Delacorte Theater) (return engagement)Funny Face (1978) (Studio Arena Theater)Teeth 'n' Smiles (1979) (Off-Broadway)Wake Up, It's Time to Go to Bed (1979) (Off-Broadway) by Carson Kievman They're Playing Our Song (1979) (US national tour)The Little Prince and the Aviator (1982) (never officially opened)Little Shop of Horrors (1982) (Off-Off Broadway showcase, Off-Broadway and London)Starting Monday (1990) (Off-Broadway)Weird Romance (1992) (Off-Broadway)Three Men on a Horse (1993) (Broadway)Oliver! (1997) (North Shore Music Theatre)The First Picture Show (1999) (San Francisco)A Broadway Diva Christmas (2005) (Women's Project)Guys and Dolls (2009) (Hollywood Bowl concert)Betwixt! (2011) (London)Little Shop of Horrors'' (2015) (Encores! Off-Center)

Awards and nominations

References

External links
 
 
 
 

20th-century American actresses
21st-century American actresses
20th-century American singers
21st-century American singers
20th-century American women singers
21st-century American women singers
Actresses from New York City
American film actresses
American musical theatre actresses
Jewish American actresses
American stage actresses
American television actresses
Living people
People from Brooklyn
People from Nassau County, New York
Nightclub performers
Singers from New York City
21st-century American Jews
Year of birth missing (living people)